General elections were held in Mauritius in August 1948. They were the first under a new constitution, which established a Legislative Council with 19 elected members, 12 appointed members and 3 ex officio members, and expanded the franchise to all adults who could write their name in one of the island's languages. They were won by the Labour Party led by Guy Rozemont, with eleven of the 19 elected seats won by Hindus. However, the Governor-General Donald Mackenzie-Kennedy appointed twelve conservatives to the Council on 23 August, largely to ensure the dominance of English and French speakers.

They were the first elections held under the new constitution and the first in which women stood as candidate. Emilienne Rochecouste, who ran as an independent, was elected in Plaines Wilhems–Black River, becoming the first Mauritian woman elected to the Legislative Council. Following the elections, Denise De Chazal was appointed as one of the twelve nominated members.

Results
The elections were held over two days, with Port Louis and Plaines Wilhems-Rivière Noire voting on 9 August and the remainder voting on 10 August.

References

1948
1948 in Mauritius
1948 elections in Africa